The Sandpipers were an American easy listening trio who carved a niche in 1960s folk rock with their vocals and innovative arrangements of international ballads and pop standards. They are best remembered for their cover version of "Guantanamera", which became a transatlantic top 10 hit in 1966, and their top 20 hit "Come Saturday Morning" from the soundtrack of the film The Sterile Cuckoo in 1970.

Singing in English, Spanish, French, Italian, Portuguese, Latin, and Tagalog, the Sandpipers had seven separate album entries in the Billboard 200 from 1966-1970, and over a dozen charted singles.

Career
Founding members Jim Brady (born August 24, 1944, Los Angeles), Mike Piano (born October 26, 1944, Rochester, New York) and Richard Shoff (born April 30, 1944, Seattle) first performed together in the Mitchell Boys Choir, before forming the Four Seasons with friend Nick Cahuernga. Due to the rising popularity of a group with that name from New Jersey, they changed their name to the Grads and continued as a trio.

Although the Grads did not enter the charts with their early recordings, they performed well enough to secure a residency at Harrah's Lake Club (now Harveys Lake Tahoe) where a friend brought them to the attention of Herb Alpert of A&M Records. Alpert was impressed with the Grads, but after one single without success the group agreed to a name change, choosing the Sandpipers out of a dictionary. After the name change, their producer, Tommy LiPuma, recommended they record the Cuban anthem "Guantanamera" and they had their first hit. The use of female singers (including Robie Lester) to add background vocals on "Guantanamera" established a trend that the Sandpipers would incorporate in multiple future studio recordings and live shows.

Initially Kathy Westmoreland (de) (later with Elvis Presley) toured with the group to provide the lyricless vocals that were used much like second strings, adding an ethereal quality to the Sandpipers' sound. Later Pamela Ramcier was the primary back-up vocalist. At times two or more back-up vocalists were used. For the Sandpipers' first live show in San Diego, two female singers were on stage, the well-known folk singer Penny Nichols and Pat Woolley. Early pressings of the Guantanamera LP showed a five person group—two females with Piano, Shoff, and Brady—on the back cover while later pressings had just the male trio. Subsequent albums depicted only the original trio. Other backup singers followed including Stormie Sherk in 1967, and Diane Jordan and Kathy Westmoreland in 1969. Some pressings of the 1970 Come Saturday Morning LP credit "solo voices" Patrice Holloway, Carolyn Willis, and Susan Tallman.

"Guantanamera" charted in the United States in September 1966 and in the United Kingdom the following month, and remains the group's biggest hit, earning 1967 Grammy Award nominations for Best Performance by a Vocal Group and Best Contemporary Group Performance, plus gold record awards for the single and the album. They also had many lesser chart entries including cover versions of "Louie Louie", "The French Song" (Quand Le Soleil Dit Bonjour Aux Montagnes), and songs from the movies The Sterile Cuckoo and Beyond the Valley of the Dolls.

The record sleeve for their 1966 album Guantanamera was nominated for a Grammy Award for Best Album Cover - Photography. Dolores Erickson was featured on the front cover artwork. In 1967 the Baldwin Piano Company signed the group to promote the company's line of musical instruments.

In 1968, following a South Africa concert tour, they participated at the Festival di Sanremo in Italy, a highlight on the Italian music calendar. They were, as then usual, alongside Anna Identici as one of the two performers of the song "Quando M'Innamoro," which attained sixth place. The song would become more popular in the interpretation by Gigliola Cinquetti. The English version by British pop singer Engelbert Humperdinck, "A Man Without Love", became a global hit.

In 1969, the group embarked on a European tour with appearances in London, Amsterdam, Stockholm, Madrid, and Berlin. In 1970 "Come Saturday Morning" was nominated for Best Original Song and was performed by the Sandpipers at the 42nd Academy Awards ceremony. In the mid-1970s, Michael Piano left the group and was replaced in turn by Michael Brady, Gary Duckworth and Ralph Nichols (later with The Lettermen). The final 1979 single, "Singapore Girl", featured only Brady and Shoff.

Original member Michael Piano died on December 29, 2014, in Kauai, Hawaii. Jim Brady died on May 5, 2019, in Durango, Colorado.

Other groups named Sandpipers
In 1965-66, an American girl group from Pensacola, Florida briefly toured and recorded as the Sandpipers, backed by an early Gregg and Duane Allman band called the Allman Joys. After "Guantanamera" was released they became the Daisies.
Another group known as the Sandpipers (or sometimes the Golden Sandpipers) sang for Golden Records, most notably the theme to Mighty Mouse, the version that is now the best known and perhaps the original (although some sources cite the Terrytooners with Mitch Miller and orchestra).
There was a South African folk rock group active in the 1960s also named the Sandpipers.
A female choral group at Albertus Magnus College known as the Sandpipers released an LP in 1961.
A South Florida trio (Art Williams, Wally Pape, Billy Stuart) released one LP, The Singin', Swingin' Sandpipers, in 1965 on the Art label.
A New York group released one single as the Sandpipers in 1966 on the Kismet label.
A Detroit group released one single as the Sandpipers in 1966 on the Giant label.
The Nashville-based Cypress label released a single by the Sand Pipers in 1966.
A Malaysian group released three EPs as the Sandpipers in the 1960s: Hey Tak Malu on the Maria label, and Nyatakan Lah Pada Ku and Deritaan Insan (with Siti Khatijah Hamid) on the Playboy label.
An instrumental group from Mason City, Iowa, released an LP, The Sandpipers Play Fiesta! and Other Favorites, in the late 1960s on the Fredlo label featuring several Herb Alpert covers.
A country and western LP, Silver Dollar Saloon, and an EP, Irish Eyes, were released in 1975 by Gary Lane, Chris Beckett, and the Sandpipers.

Discography

Albums
U.S. releases on A&M Records unless otherwise noted. Some releases in U.K. and other countries had different titles, alternate covers, and variations in track lists.
 Guantanamera (LP-117*/SP-4117, 1966, #13)
 The Sandpipers (LP-125*/SP-4125, 1967, #53)
 Misty Roses (LP-135*/SP-4135, 1967, #135)
 Softly (SP-4147, 1968, #180)
 Spanish Album (SP-4159, 1969)
 The Wonder of You (SP-4180, 1969, #194)
 Second Spanish Album (AMLS-969, 1970) (UK release)
 Come Saturday Morning (SP-4262, 1970, #96)
 A Gift of Song (SP-4328, 1971)
 Overdue (Satril SATL 4006, 1976) (UK release)
 Ay, Ay, Ay, Manila! (RCA XFPLI-021, 1977) (Philippines release)

*Mono

EPs
 Misty Roses (A&M SP-425, 1967), 6-song jukebox EP

Compilations
 I Successi Dei Sandpipers (A&M POP 79, 1969, Italy)
 Greatest Hits (A&M SP-4246, 1970, #160)
 Softly as I Leave You (A&M AMLS 975, 1970, UK)
 Michelle (A&M/Summit SRA-250-081, 1970, Australia)
 La Bamba (A&M/Mayfair AMLB 51030, 1971, UK)
 Golden Double Deluxe (A&M AMW-23, 1971, Japan)
 Golden Prize (A&M GP-207, 1971, Japan)
 Stars in Gold (A&M 80 828 XT, 1972, Germany)
 Sweet with a Beat (Reader's Digest RDS 7096, 1973, Germany)
 Foursider (A&M SP-6015, 1973)
 Portrait Of The Sandpipers (A&M AMLC4004, 1973, UK)
 O Melhor De (Opus/Columbia 413.615, 1984, Brazil)
 The Sandpipers: A&M Gold Series (A&M D25Y3263, 1988, Japan)
 The Sandpipers: Digitally Remastered Best (Universal/A&M 487252, 1998)

Soundtracks
 The Sterile Cuckoo (Paramount PAS-5009, 1970) - "Come Saturday Morning", "Montage", "End Walk"
 Beyond the Valley of the Dolls (20th Century Fox TFS 4211, 1970) - "Beyond the Valley of the Dolls"
 Beerfest (Element ABA0098, 2006) - "Enamorado"
 The Wrecking Crew (Rockbeat ROC 3313, 2008) - "Guantanamera"

Appearances
 Million Dollar Sound Sampler (A&M LP-9001, 1966) - "Strangers in the Night"
 Family Portrait - 16 Outstanding Selections From A&M Records (A&M SP-19002, 1967) - "Fly Me to the Moon"
 As 13 De Sorte (Fermata FB-179, 196?, Brazil) - "Guantanamera", "Strangers in the Night"
 San Remo '68 (CGD FG 5038, 1968, Italy) - "Quando M'Innamoro"
 Armed Forces Radio & Television Station Library (RL 9-8, 1968) - "The French Song", "Bon Soir Dame" 
 Jewel Box (A&M SP-19006, 1969) - "Cancion De Amor (Wanderlove)"
 Burt Bacharach & Friends (A&M SP-19007, 1969) - "Where There's a Heartache"
 Introducing Stereo '70 (A&M AMLB 1002, 1971, UK) - "The Windmills of Your Mind", "Cuando Salí De Cuba"
 Introducing Stereo '71 (RCA/Camden CAM/S-538, 1971, Mexico) - "The Windmills of Your Mind", "Cuando Salí De Cuba"
 10 Mayfair Hits (A&M/Mayfair SMF66-9885, 197?, Australia) - "Windmills of Your Mind", "The Wind Will Change Tomorrow"
 The Look of Love (Columbia P2 6020, 1973) - "The World Is a Circle"
 The Hamlet Collection (A&M/Hamlet SAMP.8888, 1975) - "Ojos Espanoles" "Yesterday"
 Family Portrait (A&M 86 768 XAT, 1975, Netherlands) - "Just an Old Fashioned Love Song"
 The Best of Louie, Louie (Rhino RNEP 605, 1983) - "Louie, Louie"
 This Land Is Our Land: The Pop-Folk Years (Rhino R2 71834, 2003) - "Guantanamera" 
 A&M Records - History 100 (A&M 90680-4, 2007, Japan, 5-CD Box Set) - "Guantanamera", "Louie Louie", "Come Saturday Morning"

Singles

Notes

See also
List of folk musicians
List of former A&M Records artists
List of artists who have covered The Beatles

References

External links
Sandpipers bio at Way Back Attack
Sandpipers at Sanremo 1968

A&M Records artists
Musical groups established in 1965
Musical groups disestablished in 1975
Folk rock groups from California
American folk musical groups
Musical groups from Los Angeles
American musical trios
Spanish-language singers of the United States